Take Me There may refer to:

 "Take Me There" (Blackstreet & Mýa song), 1998
 "Take Me There" (Rascal Flatts song), 2007
 "Take Me There", a song by Westlife from the 2019 album  Spectrum